Elizabeth Cunningham (born 1953) is a feminist visionary novelist and author of The Maeve Chronicles, which includes the books The Passion of Mary Magdalen, Magdalen Rising (a prequel), Bright Dark Madonna and Red-Robed Priestess. Earlier books include The Wild Mother and How To Spin Straw Into Gold.

A descendant of nine generations of Episcopal priests, Cunningham expressed the desire to reconcile her Christian origins with a sense of the Divine Feminine. She completed her undergraduate work in English at Harvard in 1976. Now an ordained interfaith minister, she is in private practice as a counselor. Cunningham is also director of the Center at High Valley in New York's Hudson Valley.

External links
Official Website

1953 births
Living people
Harvard College alumni
American feminist writers
Feminism and spirituality
American women novelists
21st-century American women